Austrian singer and recording artist Conchita Wurst has released three studio albums and eighteen singles. Her debut studio album, Conchita, was released in May 2015. The album peaked at number one on the Austrian Albums Chart, and includes the singles "Rise like a Phoenix" (her Eurovision Song Contest 2014 winning song), "Heroes", "You Are Unstoppable", "Firestorm" and "Colours of Your Love". Her second studio album, From Vienna with Love, was released in October 2018. The album peaked at number one on the Austrian Albums Chart, and includes the singles "The Sound of Music" and "Für mich soll's rote Rosen regnen". His third studio album and first as WURST, Truth Over Magnitude, was released in October 2019. The album peaked at number three on the Austrian Albums Chart, and includes the singles "Trash All the Glam", "Hit Me", "See Me Now", "To the Beat", "Forward" and "Under the Gun".

Albums

Singles

As lead artist

As featured artist

References

Discographies of Austrian artists